The Morning After is the second studio album by American rock band The J. Geils Band. The album was released on October 2, 1971, by Atlantic Records. The song "Cry One More Time" was later covered by Gram Parsons on his first solo album.

Track listing

Juke Joint Jimmy is a pseudonym used by The J. Geils Band for group compositions.

Personnel

The J. Geils Band
 Peter Wolf – lead vocals
 J. Geils – guitar
 Magic Dick – harmonica
 Seth Justman – keyboards
 Danny Klein – bass
 Stephen Jo Bladd – drums

Technical
 Seth Justman – producer
 Bill Szymczyk – producer, engineer
 George Marino – digital remastering
 Stephen Paley – photography
 Sam Cooperstein – design
 Fred Lewis - special assistance

Charts
Album

Singles

References

1971 albums
The J. Geils Band albums
Albums produced by Bill Szymczyk
Atlantic Records albums